Cathy R. Silak (born May 25, 1950) is the former dean of the Concordia University School of Law in Boise, Idaho. She is a former justice of the Idaho Supreme Court and the Idaho Court of Appeals.

Silak graduated from New York University in New York City with a Bachelor of Arts in sociology and French literature, then attended the University of California in Berkeley, earning her Juris Doctor in 1976 from its School of Law (Boalt Hall). After working in private practice in San Francisco and Washington, D.C. and as a U.S. attorney in New York City, she moved west to Idaho, her husband's home state, in 1983.

At age 40, Silak was appointed by Governor Cecil Andrus to the Court of Appeals in August 1990, the first woman to serve on Idaho's second-highest court. Less than three years later, she was elevated by Andrus to the state supreme court, succeeding Robert Bakes, and joined Linda Copple Trout as the first  two women to serve on it.

Silak retained her seat in the statewide election (57.7%) in May 1994, defeating Wayne Kidwell, a future colleague on the court. Six years later, she was unseated by Dan Eismann (58.6%) in May 2000, the only defeat  for an incumbent on the court since 1944. The previous autumn, Silak wrote the 3–2 majority opinion that upheld an earlier decision on wilderness area water rights, siding with the federal government, which became a key factor in the election campaign.

After the supreme court, Silak was a partner with Hawley, Troxell, Ennis, & Hawley until 2004, when she became president and CEO of the Idaho Community Foundation, a statewide public charity based in Boise. Silak joined Concordia University's School of Law in 2008.

References

External links
Concordia University: Cathy R. Silak
Idaho Trial Lawyers Association: Cathy Silak

1950 births
Living people
20th-century American judges
20th-century American women lawyers
20th-century American lawyers
21st-century American judges
California lawyers
Idaho lawyers
Justices of the Idaho Supreme Court
Deans of law schools in the United States
Lawyers from Washington, D.C.
New York University alumni
People from Boise, Idaho
UC Berkeley School of Law alumni
20th-century American women judges
21st-century American women judges